Martin Jurkemik (born 14 November 1989 in Bratislava) is a Slovak football defender who last played for Slovak 2. liga club ŠK SFM Senec.

MFK Ružomberok

In summer 2011, he joined Slovak club MFK Ružomberok on a two-year contract. He made his debut for MFK Ružomberok against FC Spartak Trnava on 30 April 2011.

External links
MFK Ružomberok profile

Eurofotbal profile

References

1989 births
Living people
Slovak footballers
Association football defenders
FK Slovan Duslo Šaľa players
MFK Ružomberok players
ŠK Senec players
Slovak Super Liga players
Footballers from Bratislava